George Sargent (1859–1921) was an Australian  businessman. George and his wife Charlotte Sargent (née Foster) (1856–1924) were both pastry cooks and caterers. Together with their son Foster Sargent, they founded Sargent's meat pies company in 1906.

Life and career
He trained as a baker and, after migrating to Australia, he worked in a bakery in George Street, Sydney, where he became foreman. The couple started selling pies for a penny in a small shop in Paddington, New South Wales in 1891. In 1913, Sargents were producing 150,000 pies per week at their factory in Burton Street, Darlinghurst.

In 1919,  a boarding house keeper named Mary Mahony sought damages of £400 against Sargents, having claimed that she had been served a pie containing portions of a rodent. Mahony was awarded £25, but later evidence emerged of a conspiracy. At the subsequent retrial, the reputation of Sargent's pies was vindicated by the jury's verdict.

In 1927, over 10,000 pies needed to be buried as they were left over from the opening of the Old Parliament House in Canberra, after the size of the crowd had been overestimated.

Acquisition 
In 1992, Sargents acquired the Big Ben brand name from George Weston Foods.

References

External links
 Sargents

Australian businesspeople
Burials at Waverley Cemetery
1859 births
1921 deaths
Australian bakers